Jack McDevitt (born April 14, 1935) is an American science fiction author whose novels frequently deal with attempts to make contact with alien races, and with archaeology or xenoarchaeology. Most of his books follow either superluminal pilot Priscilla "Hutch" Hutchins or galactic relic hunters Alex Benedict and Chase Kolpath. McDevitt has received numerous nominations for Hugo, Nebula, and John W. Campbell awards. Seeker won the 2006 Nebula Award for Best Novel.

McDevitt's first published story was "The Emerson Effect" in The Twilight Zone Magazine in 1981.

Biography
McDevitt went to La Salle University, where a short story of his won the annual Freshman Short Story Contest and was published in the school's literary magazine, Four Quarters. As McDevitt explained in an interview:

McDevitt received a master's degree in literature from Wesleyan University in 1971. He returned to writing when his wife, Maureen, encouraged him to try his hand at it in 1980. , McDevitt lives near Brunswick, Georgia. In 2005, he donated his archive to the department of Rare Books and Special Collections at Northern Illinois University. The novel Seeker won the 2006 Nebula Award for Best Novel, given by the Science Fiction and Fantasy Writers of America.  He has been nominated for the Nebula Award sixteen times; Seeker is his only win.

Themes 
With The Engines of God (1994), McDevitt introduced the idea of a universe that was once teeming with intelligent life, but contains only their abandoned artifacts by the time humans arrive on the scene. The main character of The Engines of God, pilot Priscilla Hutchins, has since appeared in seven more books, Deepsix (2001), Chindi (2002), Omega (2003), Odyssey (2006), Cauldron (2007), StarHawk (2013), and The Long Sunset (2018). The mystery surrounding the destructive "Omega Clouds" (which are introduced in The Engines of God) is left unexplored until Omega.

McDevitt's novels frequently raise questions which he does not attempt to answer. He prefers to leave ambiguities to puzzle and intrigue his readers: "Some things are best left to the reader's very able imagination."  The SF Site's Steven H Silver has written about this:

Bibliography

Novels
The Hercules Text (1986) (a revised version was also published as part of Hello Out There)
Eternity Road (1998)
Moonfall (1998)
Infinity Beach (2000) (variant title (UK) Slow Lightning)
Time Travelers Never Die (2009)
The Cassandra Project, with Mike Resnick (2012)

Academy Series - Priscilla "Hutch" Hutchins
StarHawk (2013), (prequel) 
The Engines of God (1994), (book 1) 
Deepsix (2001), (book 2) 
Chindi (2002), (book 3) 
Omega (2003), (book 4), 
Odyssey (2006), (book 5), 
Cauldron (2007), (book 6) 
The Long Sunset (2018), (book 7), 
The short stories "Melville on Iapetus" (1983), "Promises to Keep" (1984), "Oculus" (2002), "The Big Downtown" (2005), "Kaminsky at War" (2006), "Maiden Voyage" (2012), "Waiting at the Altar" (2012), and "The Cat's Pajamas" (2012) are also set in the Academy universe.

Alex Benedict
A Talent for War (1989) (also published as part of Hello Out There)
Polaris (2004), 
Seeker (2005) - winner of Nebula Award for Best Novel, 
The Devil's Eye (2008), 
Echo (2010), 
Firebird (November 1, 2011), 
Coming Home (November 4, 2014), 
Octavia Gone (May 7, 2019), 
Village in the Sky (Gallery Publishing Group/Saga Press, January 31, 2023), 

The short stories "In the Tower" (1987) and "A Voice in the Night" (2013) are also set in the Alex Benedict universe.

Ancient Shores
Ancient Shores (1996)
Thunderbird (2015)
Doorway to the Stars (scheduled for a 2023 release)

Short fiction

Collections
Standard Candles (Tachyon Publications, 1996)
Hello Out There (Meisha Merlin, 2000) (omnibus edition of A Talent for War and a revised The Hercules Text)
Ships in the Night (AAB, 2005)
Outbound (ISFiC Press, 2006), 
Cryptic: The Best Short Fiction of Jack McDevitt (Subterranean Press, February 2009), 
A Voice in the Night (Subterranean Press, August 2018), 
Return to Glory (Subterranean Press, October 2022)

List of stories

 "The Far Shore" (1982)
 "Black to Move" (1982)
 "Crossing Over" (1983)
 "The Jersey Rifle" (1983)
 "Cryptic" (1983)
 "Melville on Iapetus" (1983) - set in the Academy universe
 "Translations from the Colosian" (1984)
 "Promises to Keep" (1984) - set in the Academy universe
 "Tidal Effects" (1985)
 "Voice in the Dark" (1986)
 "Combinations" (1986)
 "Dutchman" (1987) - later re-worked as the full-length novel A Talent for War
 "In the Tower" (1987) - takes place in the same universe as the Alex Benedict novels
 "To Hell with the Stars" (1987)
 "Sunrise" (1988) - a modified version of Chapter 15 of the full-length novel A Talent for War
 "Last Contact" (1988)
 "The Fort Moxie Branch" (1988)
 "Whistle" (1989)
 "Leap of Faith" (1989)
 "Time's Arrow" (1989) - originally published as "Hard Landings"
 "Tracks" (1989)
 "It's a Long Way to Alpha Centauri" (1990)
 "Happy Birthday" (1990) - with Mark L. Van Name, a prose story in The Further Adventures of The Joker
 "Tyger" (1991)
 "Date with Destiny" (1991)
 "Lake Agassiz" (1991)
 "Gus" (1991)
 "Valkyrie" (1991)
 "The Tomb" (1991)
 "Auld Lang Boom" (1992)
 "Ships in the Night" (1993)
 "Midnight Clear" (1993)
 "Talk Radio" (1993)
 "Standard Candles" (1994)
 "Blinker" (1994)
 "Windrider" (1994)
 "Glory Days" (1994)
 "Ellie" (1995)
 "Cruising through Deuteronomy" (1995)
 "Deus Tex" (1996)
 "Time Travelers Never Die" (1996) - later re-worked as a full-length novel with the same name
 "Holding Pattern" (1996)
 "Never Despair" (1997) 
 "Variables" (1997) 
 "Report from the Rear" (1998)
 "Good Intentions" (1998) (with Stanley Schmidt)
 "Dead in the Water" (1999)
 "Nothing Ever Happens in Rock City" (2001)
 "Oculus" (2002) - set in the Academy universe
 "The Law of Gravity Isn't Working on Rainbow Bridge" (2003)
 "Act of God" (2004)
 "Windows" (2004) 
 "The Mission" (2004) 
 "Henry James, This One's for You" (2005) 
 "The Big Downtown" (2005) - set in the Academy universe
 "Ignition" (2005)
 "The Candidate" (2006)
 "Lighthouse" (2006) - with Michael Shara, a Kristi Lang and Greg Cooper story 
 "Kaminsky at War" (2006) - set in the Academy universe
 "Cool Neighbor" (2007) - with Michael Shara, a Kristi Lang and Greg Cooper story 
 "Fifth Day" (2007)
 "Friends in High Places" (2007)
 "Tweak" (2007)
 "Indomitable" (2008) 
 "The Adventure of the Southsea Trunk" (2008) 
 "Molly's Kids" (2008) 
 "Welcome to Valhalla" (2008) (with Kathryn Lance)
 "The Cassandra Project" (2010) - expanded into a novel with Mike Resnick
 "Dig Site" (2011)
 "Maiden Voyage" (2012) - set in the Academy universe 
 "Listen Up, Nitwits" (2012)
 "The Cat's Pajamas" (2012) - set in the Academy universe
 "Lucy" (2012) 
 "Waiting at the Altar" (2012)
 "A Voice in the Night" (2013) - features a sixteen-year-old Alex Benedict
 "Cathedral" (2013)
 
 "Searching for Oz" (2013)
 "Enjoy the Moment" (2014)

Essays and other contributions

Awards and nominations
 Nebula Best Short Story nominee (1983) : Cryptic
 Philip K. Dick Award (special citation) (1986) : The Hercules Text 
 Nebula Best Short Story nominee (1988) : "The Fort Moxie Branch"
 Hugo Best Short Story nominee (1989) : "The Fort Moxie Branch"
 International UPC Science Fiction Award winner (1993) : "Ships in the Night" (first English language winner) 
 Nebula Best Novella nominee (1996) : "Time Travelers Never Die"
 Arthur C. Clarke Best Novel nominee (1997) : Engines of God 
 Hugo Best Novella nominee (1997) : "Time Travelers Never Die"
 Nebula Best Novel nominee (1997) : Ancient Shores 
 Nebula Best Novel nominee (1998) : Moonfall 
 Nebula Best Novelette nominee (1999) : "Good Intentions" (co-writer Stanley Schmidt)
 Nebula Best Novel nominee (2000) : Infinity Beach 
 John W. Campbell Memorial Award for Best Novel nominee (2001) : Infinity Beach 
 John W. Campbell Memorial Award for Best Novel nominee (2002) : Deepsix 
 Nebula Best Short Story nominee (2002) : "Nothing Ever Happens in Rock City"
 Nebula Best Novel nominee (2003) : Chindi 
 Campbell Award winner (2004) : Omega 
 Nebula Best Novel nominee (2004) : Omega 
 Nebula Best Novel nominee (2005) : Polaris 
 Nebula Best Novel winner (2006) : Seeker 
 John W. Campbell Memorial Award for Best Novel nominee (2006) : Seeker 
 John W. Campbell Memorial Award for Best Novel nominee (2007) : Odyssey 
 Nebula Best Novel nominee (2007) : Odyssey 
 Nebula Best Novel nominee (2008) : Cauldron 
 Nebula Best Novel nominee (2010) : Echo 
 Nebula Best Novel nominee (2011) : Firebird 
 Nebula Best Novel nominee (2014) : Coming Home 
 Robert A. Heinlein Award winner (2015)

See also
 Flickinger field

References

External links

Jack McDevitt's Home Page
Profile of Jack McDevitt  by Michael Swanwick
Official forum at The Internet Book Database of Fiction

The Jack McDevitt Papers at Northern Illinois University
Story Behind Starhawk - Online Essay by Jack McDevitt

1935 births
Living people
20th-century American novelists
21st-century American novelists
American male novelists
American science fiction writers
American male short story writers
Analog Science Fiction and Fact people
Nebula Award winners
Wesleyan University alumni
20th-century American male writers
21st-century American male writers
People from Philadelphia